A list of flash guns, for easy comparison of strobes, from different manufactures. The list is intended to supplement the  list of photographic equipment makers.

List of current models

List of discontinued models

See also
Comparison of digital single-lens reflex cameras

Notes

References

Photographic lighting
Technological comparisons